Odites periscias is a moth in the family Depressariidae. It was described by Edward Meyrick in 1928. It is found in the Philippines (Luzon).

The wingspan is about 19 mm. The forewings are ochreous whitish, with the costa white and the second discal stigma small and blackish. The hindwings are ochreous white.

References

Moths described in 1928
Odites
Taxa named by Edward Meyrick